Maidan Shar, also Maidan Shahr or simply Maidan, is the capital of Maidan Wardak province in central Afghanistan. Its population was estimated to be 35,008 in 2003, of which are Pashtuns, Hazaras and Tajiks.

On 15 August 2021, Maidan Shar was seized by Taliban fighters, becoming the twenty-seventh provincial capital to be captured by the Taliban as part of the wider 2021 Taliban offensive.

Description
The city of Maidan Shar has a population of 14,265. It has 4 districts and a total land area of 3,347 hectares. The total number of dwellings in Maidan Shar is 1,585.

Zarifa Ghafari became the mayor in 2019, she is one of the few Afghan female mayors, and the youngest to be appointed at the age of 26. She has won awards for her efforts in empowering women's rights in Afghanistan.

Climate
Maidan Shar features a warm-summer humid continental climate (Dsb) under the Köppen climate classification. It has warm, dry summers and cold, snowy winters. The average temperature in Maidan Shar is 7.6 °C, while the annual precipitation averages 558 mm.

July is the warmest month of the year, with an average temperature of 20.8 °C. The coldest month, January, has an average temperature of -7.4 °C.

Land use
Maidan Shar is an urban village located 40 km west of Kabul. The majority of the land is not occupied or utilized with barren land and vacant plots combining for 81% of total land use. Institutional land is the second largest built-up land use (22%). Residential dwellings are concentrated in Districts 1 and 2.

Geography
Maidan Shar is located in the north eastern part of Wardak Province. It is surrounded by the Arghandeh and Paghman mountains of Kabul Province and the Jalrez and Nirkh districts of Wardak Province.

It has an area of 345 km2. Its elevation above sea level is 2,225 meters.

The district consists of 59 main villages and 1 sub-village.

Economy
The majority of people in Maidan Shar are engaged in agriculture, livestock, gardening and trade. The overall economical status of the people of Maidan Shar is poor.

Education
By the end of 2008, there were a total of 14 schools serving approximately 9,268 students. There were around 275 teachers teaching in these schools.

Notable people
Hanif Baktash, poet and writer
Zarifa Ghafari, mayor

References

Populated places in Maidan Wardak Province
Provincial capitals in Afghanistan